John Boscoe Lawlor (born 30 January 1937) is a Scottish former professional footballer who played in the Football League as a left winger.

References

Sources

1937 births
Living people
Scottish footballers
Association football wingers
Kilmarnock F.C. players
Aldershot F.C. players
Dumbarton F.C. players
East Stirlingshire F.C. players
Stirling Albion F.C. players
Falkirk F.C. players
Alloa Athletic F.C. players
East Fife F.C. players
Stranraer F.C. players
Hamilton Academical F.C. players
Scottish Football League players
English Football League players